The 2015–16 Indian Federation Cup, also known as  2015–16 Hero Federation Cup due to sponsorship reasons was the 37th edition of the Federation Cup, the main national football cup competition in India. The tournament was held from 30 April 2016 to 21 May 2016. Top 8 teams from 2015–16 I-League participated in the tournament. Ten Sports Network, the Official Broadcaster of Hero Federation Cup 2016 will telecast only the Semi-finals and the Final match while Knockout stage matches will be streamed live on I-league website.

Bengaluru FC were the reigning champions of the Federation Cup, having won the tournament in 2015. However, they were upset in the quarter-finals by 8th placed Aizawl.

All matches except the final were played as two-legged tie on home and away basis, with the application of the away goals rule. The final was played as a single match at the Indira Gandhi Stadium in Guwahati.

The final was played between Mohun Bagan and Aizawl on 21 May 2016. Mohun Bagan defeated Aizawl 5–0 to clinch their record 14th title, making them the most successful club in the history of the competition.

Background
In 2015, All India Football Federation decided to scrap Federation Cup due to congested calendar with I-League and Indian Super League occupying a large part of the calendar, but after Asian Football Confederation mandated that a club must play 18 matches in the season, AIFF decided to revive the tournament.

Teams

Following teams have qualified for Federation Cup:

 Bengaluru FC
 Mohun Bagan
 East Bengal
 Sporting Goa
 Mumbai
 Shillong Lajong
 Salgaocar
 Aizawl

Rounds and dates
The tournament will be played between top 8 teams of 2015–16 I-League as the knock-out tournament on home and away basis.

Bracket

Quarter-finals

Semi-finals

Final

Goalscorers

8 Goals:
  Jeje Lalpekhlua (Mohun Bagan)

4 Goals:
  Joel Sunday (Aizawl)

3 Goals:
  Sony Norde (Mohun Bagan)

2 Goals:

  Bikramjit Singh (Mohun Bagan)
  Fábio Pena (Shillong Lajong)
  Sumit Passi (Sporting Goa)

1 Goal:

  Abhishek Das (Mohun Bagan)
  Alfred Jaryan (Aizawl)
  Azharuddin Mallick (Mohun Bagan)
  Calvin Mbarga (Salgaocar)
  C.K. Vineeth (Bengaluru FC)
  David Lalrinmuana (Aizawl)
  Dhanachandra Singh (Mohun Bagan)
  Do Dong-hyun (East Bengal)
  Eugeneson Lyngdoh (Bengaluru FC)
  Glan Martins (Sporting Goa)
  Katsumi Yusa (Mohun Bagan)
  Konsham Singh (Shillong Lajong)
  Lalchawnkima (Aizawl)
  Lalrindika Ralte (East Bengal)
  Martin Scott (Salgaocar)
  Ranti Martins (East Bengal)
  Subhasish Bose (Sporting Goa)
  Sunil Chhetri (Bengaluru FC)
  Uilliams Bomfim Souza (Shillong Lajong)

Hat-tricks

References

External links
 Section on the All India Football Federation website.

 
2015-16
India
Federation Cup